The men's 400 metres event at the 2023 European Athletics Indoor Championships will be held on 3 March 2023 at 09:50 (heats), on 3 March at 19:35 (semi-finals), and on 4 March at 20:20 (final) local time.

Medalists

Records

Results

Heats
Qualification: First 2 in each heat (Q) and the next 2 fastest (q) advance to the Semifinals.

Semifinals
Qualification: First 3 in each heat (Q) advance to the Final.

Final

References

2023 European Athletics Indoor Championships
400 metres at the European Athletics Indoor Championships